Samuel George Coppersmith (born May 22, 1955) is an American attorney and former politician who served as the U.S. representative for Arizona's 1st congressional district from 1993 to 1995. He is a member of the Democratic Party.

Early years
Coppersmith was born May 22, 1955 in Johnstown, Pennsylvania. He graduated magna cum laude from Harvard University in 1976, and then worked as a Foreign Service Officer with the U.S. State Department, assigned to the U.S. Embassy in Port of Spain, Trinidad and Tobago. He returned to the U.S. then earned a J.D. from Yale Law School in 1982. After law school, he clerked for Judge William C. Canby Jr., of the U.S. Court of Appeals for the Ninth Circuit, and served as an assistant to the Mayor of Phoenix.

House of Representatives
In 1992, Coppersmith won the Democratic primary in Arizona's 1st District and faced three-term Republican Jay Rhodes in the general election. Coppersmith won the elections and became a U.S. Representative from the Democratic Party for Arizona's 1st Congressional District."

Senate race

In 1994, Coppersmith gave up his seat after only one term to run for the U.S. Senate when Dennis DeConcini retired. In the Democratic race to replace the retiring DeConcini, Rep. Sam Coppersmith won with a razor-thin margin of 32 votes (81,547 votes vs 81,515 for Richard Mahoney). He subsequently lost to fellow Congressman Jon Kyl by 14 points.

Private law practice

After leaving Congress, Coppersmith spent two years as the chairman of the Arizona Democratic Party.  He is  an attorney specializing in real estate law and a managing partner of the law firm of Coppersmith Schermer & Brockelman PLC. He has a blog called LiberalDesert. He is also a member of the ReFormers Caucus of Issue One.

See also

 List of Jewish members of the United States Congress

References

External links

 

1955 births
Living people
American male bloggers
American bloggers
Arizona lawyers
Arizona Democratic Party chairs
Politicians from Johnstown, Pennsylvania
Harvard University alumni
Yale Law School alumni
Democratic Party members of the United States House of Representatives from Arizona
Jewish members of the United States House of Representatives
21st-century American Jews